Otto Hilgard Tittmann (August 20, 1850 – August 21, 1938) was an American geodesist, geographer, and astronomer of German descent.

Biography
Tittmann was born in 1850, in Belleville, Illinois to revolutionary parents fleeing the aftermath of the 1848 revolutions. He attended school in St. Louis, and in 1867 joined the U.S. Coast and Geodetic Survey. In 1874 he was assistant astronomer in Japan to view the Transit of Venus and from 1889 until 1893 he was in charge of weights and measures. In 1888 he co-founded the National Geographic Society. In 1899, Tittmann served as president of the Philosophical Society of Washington. And, from 1895 until 1900 he was assistant in charge of the US Coast and Geodetic Survey. From 1900 until 1915 he was Superintendent of the Survey, and from 1915 until 1919 he was president of the National Geographic Society. He died in Leesburg, Virginia, in 1938.

References

External links
 

1850 births
1938 deaths
National Geographic Society founders
American astronomers
American geographers
United States Coast and Geodetic Survey personnel
People from Belleville, Illinois